Sister Boniface Mysteries is a British detective period television series, created by Jude Tindall, which is produced by BBC Studios and BritBox. It is a spin-off of Father Brown, as the Sister Boniface character was introduced in a Father Brown episode (Series 1, Episode 6: "The Bride of Christ"). A 10-episode first series premiered on 8 February 2022, on the BritBox streaming service, and released in the UK on the UKTV Drama channel later in 2022. Sister Boniface Mysteries has completed filming on a second series.

Synopsis 
The series is set in England during the early 1960s. Sister Boniface is a Catholic nun at St. Vincent's Convent in the fictional town of Great Slaughter in the Cotswolds. In addition to her religious duties at the convent, she makes wine and has a PhD in forensic science, allowing her to serve as a scientific adviser to the local police on investigations.

The three regularly featured police officers are Detective Inspector Sam Gillespie (revealed in episode 9 to be a former army officer), Detective Sergeant Felix Livingstone (on secondment from the police force of the Imperial fortress colony of Bermuda), and Constable (WPC) Peggy Button.

Cast 
 Lorna Watson as Sister Boniface, a Catholic nun
 Max Brown as Sam Gillespie, a Detective Inspector
 Jerry Iwu as Felix Livingstone, a Detective Sergeant on secondment from Bermuda
 Miranda Raison as Ruth Penny, a newspaper reporter
 Ami Metcalf as Peggy Button, a Constable (WPC)

Supporting cast
 Belinda Lang as Mrs. Clam
 Carolyn Pickles as Reverend Mother Adrian
 Virginia Fiol as Sister Reginald
 David Sterne as Tom Thomas
 Ivan Kaye as Ted Button
 Sarah Crowden as Miss Thimble
 Robert Daws as Chief Constable Hector Lowsley
 Tina Chiang as Sister Peter

Guest cast
 Mark Williams as Father Brown
 Sylvestra Le Touzel as Prunella Gladwell

Production

Development
Father Brown executive producer Will Trotter anticipated developing a Sister Boniface spin-off as soon as Father Brown had ended. He eventually pitched the concept to Britbox. The series share several writers and directors, such as John Maidens, Paul Gibson, Kit Lambert, Tahsin Guner and Ian Barber.

Locations
The location for St Vincent's Convent is Princethorpe College, a Catholic independent day school located in Princethorpe, near Rugby, Warwickshire, England.

Episodes

Series 1 (2022)

References

External links 
 Sister Boniface Mysteries at BritBox
 Sister Boniface Mysteries at IMDb

2020s British drama television series
2020s British mystery television series
2022 British television series debuts
Adaptations of works by G. K. Chesterton
BBC high definition shows
BBC television dramas
Television series about Christian religious leaders
English-language television shows
Religious drama television series
Television series set in the 1960s
British detective television series
Television series by BBC Studios
BritBox original programming